Karyn Lynn Bye-Dietz (born May 18, 1971) is a retired ice hockey player. She was the alternate captain of the 1998 Winter Olympics gold-medal winning United States Women's Hockey Team.

In 1998, she was featured on a Wheaties box. She entered the IIHF Hall of Fame in 2011 and was inducted into the United States Hockey Hall of Fame in 2014.

Playing career

Early years
Born May 18, 1971, in River Falls, Wisconsin, Bye-Dietz played for the River Falls Wildcats Boys High School Hockey team under the name of K.L. Bye to conceal her sex. Although her father encouraged her to continue playing basketball, as she had done growing up, Bye-Dietz continued to play hockey. The 1987–88 season she recorded 3 assists in her 18 games playing Junior Varsity Hockey  Her athletic ability and play earned a scholarship to the University of New Hampshire.

NCAA
Bye-Dietz played for the New Hampshire Wildcats women's ice hockey program. She scored 164 points in 87 games for the Wildcats, leading the team all four years. As captain of the team during her junior and senior season, she twice led the Wildcats to the ECAC championships.

Bye-Dietz graduated from New Hampshire with a B.S. in physical education. From there, she attended graduate school at Concordia University in Montreal. She played for the Concordia Stingers women's ice hockey team while earning a graduate degree in sports administration.

USA Hockey
Bye-Dietz made her national team debut with Team USA at the 1992 IIHF Women's World Championship. From there, she competed in five more tournaments, winning silver in all.

In 1998, Bye-Dietz led the Team United States to their first Olympic gold medal at the 1998 Winter Olympics in Nagano. She led the team with five goals in six games and tied Cammi Granato and two others for the scoring lead with eight points. She competed with Team USA again at the 2002 Winter Olympics where they won a silver medal.

On December 16, 2010, she was selected to the International Ice Hockey Federation Hall of Fame Class of 2011.

Personal
Bye-Dietz has worked for the Minnesota Wild in its grassroots program. She teaches fitness classes at her local YMCA and previously coached her son's Mite Level 1 hockey team. , she is also a color commentator for the Minnesota Girls State High School Hockey Tournament.

Bye-Dietz married a strength and fitness coach at the University of Minnesota, and they have two children together.

In 1998, Bye-Dietz was featured on a Wheaties box.

Awards and honors
1995 Concordia University Fittest Female Athlete 
 1995 and 1998 USA Hockey Women 's Player of the Year Award  (also known as the Bob Allen Women's Player of the Year award) 
 She was inducted into the University of New Hampshire Hall of Fame in 1998.

See also 
Ice hockey at the 2002 Winter Olympics
United States at the 2002 Winter Olympics
Ice hockey at the 1998 Winter Olympics

References

External links 
Karyn Bye's U.S. Team profile
2002 Olympic photos of Karyn Bye in action
Bye is inducted into Concordia University's Hall of Fame
River Falls Journal articles about Bye
River Falls Wildcats Boys Hockey

1971 births
American women's ice hockey forwards
Ice hockey players from Wisconsin
IIHF Hall of Fame inductees
Living people
Medalists at the 1998 Winter Olympics
Medalists at the 2002 Winter Olympics
New Hampshire Wildcats women's ice hockey players
Olympic gold medalists for the United States in ice hockey
Olympic silver medalists for the United States in ice hockey
People from River Falls, Wisconsin
Ice hockey players at the 1998 Winter Olympics
Ice hockey players at the 2002 Winter Olympics